Liu Kai is the name of:

Liu Kai (Song dynasty) (947–1000), Song dynasty politician and scholar
Liu Kai (baseball) (born 1987), Chinese baseball player